John Wesley Magee (July 21, 1923November 22, 1991) was an American football guard in the National Football League. He played eight seasons for the Philadelphia Eagles (1948–1955).  He played college football at Southwestern Louisiana University and Rice University.

References

External links

1923 births
1991 deaths
People from Robstown, Texas
Players of American football from Texas
American football offensive guards
Louisiana Ragin' Cajuns football players
Rice Owls football players
Philadelphia Eagles players